German Grand Prix can refer to:

German Grand Prix, a Formula One motor race
German motorcycle Grand Prix
Speedway Grand Prix of Germany